Lewis Carl Groh (October 16, 1883 – October 20, 1960), nicknamed "Silver", was an American Major League Baseball infielder. He played for the Philadelphia Athletics during the  season. His brother, Heinie Groh, also played in the major leagues.

External links
, or Retrosheet

Major League Baseball infielders
Philadelphia Athletics players
Baseball players from New York (state)
1883 births
1960 deaths
Sportspeople from Rochester, New York
Addison White Sox players
Burials at Mount Hope Cemetery (Rochester)
Albany Senators players
Augusta Georgians players
Buffalo Bisons (minor league) players
Evansville Evas players
Hamilton Kolts players
Hartford Senators players
Lakeland Highlanders players
Lawrence Colts players
Lyons (minor league baseball) players
Paducah Indians players
Scranton Miners players
Spartanburg Pioneers players
Springfield Ponies players
Wilkes-Barre Barons (baseball) players
Wilmington Chicks players
Worcester Busters players
Youngstown Ohio Works players